Ten Million Years – Songs from the Nineteen Nineties is an album by alternative rock artist Paul Durham. Self-released on August 2, 2004, it features eleven songs recorded in the early 1990s with his band Durham, and four alternate versions of songs that would later be released on his major-label band Black Lab's debut album, Your Body Above Me.

Track listing 
"Postcards"
"Mary"
"Run Circles"
"Something About"
"Time Ago '92"
"The Ghost Tonight"
"Dream in Color '93"
"Walk Slow"
"O' Maggie"
"Sixteen"
"Home"
"Wash It Away" (Acoustic)
"Can't Keep the Rain" (Live)
"Sleeps With Angels" (Live)
"Ten Million Years '95"

2004 albums
Black Lab albums
Self-released albums